Jacqueline van den Hil (born 20 March 1968) is a Dutch politician of the conservative liberal People's Party for Freedom and Democracy (VVD). She has been serving as a member of the House of Representatives since the 2021 general election. Before entering politics, Van den Hil worked as a health care manager in her native province of Zeeland.

Early life and career 
Van den Hil was born and raised in the Zeeland city Goes. She attended the secondary school Goese Lyceum at  level in the years 1980–86. Van den Hil wanted to study medicine but failed to get in because of the quota. In the meantime, she studied economics at Erasmus University Rotterdam but quit after two years to be trained as a radiodiagnostic laboratory technician at Oosterschelde Hospital. Van den Hil kept working as a lab technician at the hospital after 1991, when her training was completed. She was promoted to medical imaging techniques manager in 2003.

Van den Hil became the manager of the nursing home Ter Schorre in Terneuzen of senior care provider SVRZ in 2008. While working there, she received a Master of Health Administration degree from TIAS School for Business and Society in 2010 after she had also studied management sciences at the Open University of the Netherlands between 2002 and 2008. Van den Hil was hired as manager of SVRZ's Ter Valcke location in Goes in 2013 and kept working there until she became an MP.

She also served on the board of Alzheimer Zeeland (2009–15) and on the supervisory board of Stichting Intervence Jeugdzorg (2018–20).

Politics 
Van den Hil joined the VVD in 2006 and was a board member of its Kapelle branch between 2009 and 2015. She was placed fifteenth on the VVD's party list in Kapelle in the 2018 municipal election. Van den Hil ran for member of parliament in the 2021 general election as the VVD's 25th candidate and was elected with 3,543 preference votes. She was sworn into the House of Representatives on 31 March as the only member from Zeeland and serves as her party's spokesperson for health care labor market policy, health care professions and education, health care in the Caribbean Netherlands, war victims, resistance fighters, child benefits, child care, mental health care, and sheltered housing). Van den Hil is a member of the Belgium contact groep and of the Committees for Foreign Trade and Development Cooperation; for Health, Welfare and Sport; for Infrastructure and Water Management; for Kingdom Relations; and for Social Affairs and Employment.

She was the VVD's  in Goes in the 2022 municipal elections.

Personal life 
Van den Hil is a resident of her birthplace Goes and she is part of the LGBT community. She lived in the nearby village Kapelle between 2000 and 2017. Van den Hil joined a local Rotary club in 2007 and has been the chair of the Goes Rotary Club since 2019.

References 

1968 births
21st-century Dutch politicians
21st-century Dutch women politicians
Dutch healthcare managers
LGBT conservatism
LGBT members of the Parliament of the Netherlands
Living people
People from Goes
People's Party for Freedom and Democracy politicians
Members of the House of Representatives (Netherlands)
21st-century Dutch LGBT people